Publius Terentius Varro Atacinus (82 – c. 35 BC) was a Roman poet, more polished in his style than the more famous and learned Varro Reatinus, his contemporary, and therefore more widely read by the Augustan writers. He was born in the province of Gallia Narbonensis, the southern part of Gaul with its capital at Narbonne, on the river Atax (now the Aude), for his cognomen Atacinus indicates his birthplace.

Writings
  
Only fragments of his works survive. He also wrote a geographical poem, Chorographia; Ephemeris, a hexameter poem on weather-signs after Aratus, from which Virgil has borrowed and (late in life) elegies to Leucadia.

His translation of the Alexandrian poet Apollonius Rhodius' Argonautica into Latin has some fine surviving lines; and was singled out for praise by Ovid: “Of Varro too what age will not be told/And Jason’s Argo and the fleece of gold?”.  Oskar Seyffert considered that the poem to have been “the most remarkable production in the domain of narrative epic poetry between the time of Ennius and that of Vergil”.

Of Varro's fragments, the  epigram on "The Tombs of the Great" is well-known; whether or not it is truly Varro's is debatable:

Patrons
Cicero as well as Caesar have been suggested as possible patrons of Varro's writings.

See also
Ennius
Priscian

Notes

Golden Age Latin writers
Ancient Roman poets
Terentii
1st-century BC Romans
1st-century BC Roman poets
82 BC births
30s BC deaths
People from Gallia Narbonensis
1st-century BC Gallo-Roman people